Bekim Iliazi (born 31 December 1993) is an Albanian footballer who most recently played for FK Kukësi in the Albanian Superliga.

He played for Sopoti Librazhd in the first half of 2014–15 season.

References

External links
 Profile - FSHF

1993 births
Living people
People from Krujë
Albanian footballers
Association football forwards
FK Partizani Tirana players
FK Kukësi players
KS Sopoti Librazhd players
Kategoria Superiore players
Kategoria e Parë players